The Better Half is a one-act play by Noël Coward first performed in 1922 by the Grand Guignol theatre company, directed by Lewis Casson. It was thought to be lost until the original script was found in the British Library in 2007.

Original production
The play was given as the final item of a quintuple bill of mixed comedy and melodrama at the Little Theatre, London on 31 May 1922, with the following cast:
Alice – Auriol Lee
Marion – Ivy Williams
The Husband – Ian Fleming

Coward recalled that the piece "was wittily played by Auriol Lee", but:

Plot
Alice has fallen out of love with her high-minded but bloodless husband, David. She discusses him with her friend Marion. It emerges that Marion finds him extremely attractive but her attempt to seduce him was unsuccessful. She leaves angrily when Alice declares that he is in love only with himself. David enters. Alice tries to provoke him by saying that she has been unfaithful to him, but he forgives her. She finally manages to enrage him by mocking his high-mindedness as a pose. The ensuing confrontation is halted by Marion's return. Alice then announces that since David and Marion have a similar outlook and are obviously made for each other, she is quite ready to relinquish him. To satisfy the divorce laws, she will take a lover and "live in flaming sin" at a de luxe hotel. She goes out, leaving the other two nonplussed. David tells Marion, "We should all try to make ourselves see things from every point of view".

History
The Stage judged the piece "exceedingly well written, but too literary". The text was not published and was thought to be lost until Richard Hand and Mike Wilson, researching for a book about Grand Guignol, discovered the script in the British Library in September 2007, where it had been deposited as part of the Lord Chamberlain's Plays collection.

The Sticking Place theatre company revived the play at the Union Theatre in Southwark, London, in a production that opened on 16 October 2007. An adaptation of the play was broadcast on BBC Radio 4 on 25 May 2009, starring Federay Holmes, Samuel West and Lisa Dillon, and directed by Martin Jarvis.

References

Sources

External links
 Coward's Women - Woman's Hour
 Coward's long-lost satire was almost too 'daring' about women - The Guardian

1922 plays
Plays by Noël Coward
One-act plays